Celebration Cruise Line was a small cruise line that operated two-day voyages out of Port of Palm Beach to Grand Bahama Island. The company was founded in late 2008, and began operations on March 9, 2009. The company moved the ship's operations from Port Everglades to the Port of Palm Beach in March 2010.

History 
The cruise line began operation in March 2009 with the Bahamas Celebration, which was formerly a cruise ferry, built in 1981 and converted to a cruise ship in 2008. The cruise line replaced Imperial Majesty Cruise Line.

In 2010, Celebration Cruise Line announced it would be moving to the Port of Palm Beach due to being overshadowed by larger cruise lines at Port Everglades. The Port of Palm Beach has a passenger terminal that was built to accommodate smaller cruise ships. In 2010, they stopped sailing to Nassau, Bahamas. Their two-night cruises then departed every other day at 6:00 pm. to Freeport, Bahamas.

On October 31, 2014, the  struck an unknown object while departing from Freeport, creating a small hole in the ship's hull and resulting in the vessel listing 10 degrees to port. All passengers and crew were unharmed.

Celebration Cruise Line ceased operations following the grounding incident. Former Celebration Cruise Line executives formed Bahamas Paradise Cruise Line and purchased the Grand Celebration to take over the route formerly operated by the Bahamas Celebration.

Former fleet

References

External links 
 

Defunct cruise lines
Transport companies established in 2008
Transport companies disestablished in 2015